The Mennonites in Bolivia are among the most traditional and conservative of all Mennonite denominations in South America. They are mostly Russian Mennonites of Frisian, Flemish, and North German descent. , there were about 70,000 Mennonites living in Bolivia.

History

Origins 

In the early-to-mid 16th century, Mennonites began to move from the Low Countries to the Vistula delta region, seeking religious freedom and exemption from military service. There they gradually replaced their Dutch and Frisian languages with the Plautdietsch dialect spoken in the area, blending into it elements of their native tongues. The Mennonites of Dutch origin were joined by Mennonites from other parts of Germany.

In 1772, most of Poland Mennonites' land in the Vistula area became part of the Kingdom of Prussia in the first of the Partitions of Poland. Frederick William II of Prussia ascended the throne in 1786 and imposed heavy fees on the Mennonites in exchange for continued military exemption.

Earlier Migrations 

In the 1760s Catherine the Great of Russia invited Mennonites from Prussia to settle north of the Black Sea in exchange for religious freedom and exemption from military service, a precondition founded in their commitment to non-violence. The ancestors of the Bolivian Mennonites settled in South Russia two main waves in the years 1789 and 1804, leaving Danzig and the Polish Vistula delta because they were being annexed by Prussia. After Russia introduced the general conscription in 1874, many Mennonites migrated to the US and Canada.

In the years after 1873 some 11,000 left the Russian Empire and settled in Manitoba, Canada, and an equal number went to Kansas, Nebraska and Dakota territory. The Russian Mennonites settled in Canada until a universal, secular compulsory education was implemented in 1917 that required the use of the English language, which the more conservative Mennonites saw as a threat to the religious basis of their community.

The more conservative Mennonites from Russia, some 6,000 people, left Canada between 1922 and 1925 and settled in Mexico. Another 1,800 more conservative Mennonites migrated to the Chaco region in Paraguay in 1927. In 1930 and in 1947 the Paraguayian Mennonites were joined by Mennonites coming directly from Russia. In the years after 1958 some 1,700 Mennonites from the Mexican settlements moved to what was then British Honduras and today is Belize.

Bolivia 
The Bolivian government granted a privilege to future Mennonite immigrants including freedom of religion, private schools and exemption from military service in the 1930s, but that was not deployed until the 1950s.

Between 1954 and 1957, a first group of 37 families from various Mennonite colonies in Paraguay established Tres Palmas colony, 25 km northeast of Santa Cruz de la Sierra. Soon, a second colony was established five km away from Tres Palmas by a group of 25 conservative families from Menno Colony in Paraguay. The settlers from Paraguay were experienced and well prepared to practice agriculture in a subtropical climate. In 1959, the total Mennonite population in Bolivia was 189.

In 1963, new settlements were founded where Mennonites from Paraguay and Canada lived together. In 1967, Mennonites from Mexico and from their daughter colonies in Belize began to settle in the Santa Cruz Department. Las Piedras colony, founded 1968, was the first colony founded exclusively by Mennonites from Canada. Most settlers in Bolivia were traditional Mennonites who wanted to separate themselves more from "the world". Altogether there were about 17,500 Mennonites living in 16 colonies in Bolivia by 1986, of whom nearly 15,000 were Old Colony Mennonites and 2,500 Bergthal or Sommerfeld Mennonites.

Colonies and population 

In 1995, there were a total of 25 Mennonite colonies in Bolivia with a total population of 28,567. The most populous ones were Riva Palacios (5,488), Swift Current (2,602), Nueva Esperanza (2,455), Valle Esperanza (2,214) and Santa Rita (1,748). In 2002 there were 40 Mennonite colonies with a population of about 38,000 people. An outreach of Conservative Mennonites can be found at La Estrella, with others in progress.

The total population was estimated at 60,000 by Lisa Wiltse in 2010.

In 2012 there were 23,818 church members in congregations of Russian Mennonites, indicating a total population of about 70,000. Another 1,170 Mennonites were in Spanish-speaking congregations. The number of colonies was 57 in 2011.

Martyna Wojciechowska, a Polish journalist, created a TV documentary about the colony in Santa Rita, as a part of her TV programme Kobieta na krańcu świata,  that aired on Polish TV on 1 October 2017. A 2020 survey found that there are more than 200 Mennonite colonies in nine Latin American countries, with 99 in Bolivia.

Rape and sexual assaults

In 2011, eight men belonging to the Manitoba Mennonite Colony were convicted of a series of sexual assaults committed from 2005 to 2009. Prior to the discovery, the rapes had been attributed to a ghost or demon. The victims were reported to be between the ages of 3 and 65. The offenders used a type of gas used by veterinarians to sedate animals during medical procedures. Despite long custodial sentences for the convicted men, an investigation in 2013 reported continuing cases of similar assaults and other sexual abuses. Canadian author Miriam Toews has made these crimes the center of her 2018 novel Women Talking.

Literature

 Huttner, Jakob. Zwischen Eigen-art und Wirk-lichkeit: Die Altkolonie-Mennoniten im bolivianischen Chaco. Berlin 2012.
 Schartner, Sieghard and Schartner, Sylvia. Bolivien: Zufluchtsort der konservativen Mennoniten. Asunción 2009.
 Cañás Bottos, Lorenzo. Old Colony Mennonites in Argentina and Bolivia: Nation Making, Religious Conflict and Imagination of the Future. Leiden et al.  2008.
 Hedberg, Anna Sofia. Outside the world: Cohesion and Deviation among Old Colony Mennonites in Bolivia. Uppsala 2007.
 Pasco, Gwenaëlle. La Colonisation Mennonite en Bolivie: Culture et agriculture dans l'Oriente. Paris 1999.

References

External links
 Photographic essay on the Mennonites of Bolivia
  Butet-Roch, Lawrence (text);  Busqué, Jordi (photographs) (February 27, 2018) "Step Back in Time With the Mennonites of Bolivia", National Geographic.
 "Data for "Pious Pioneers: The expansion of Mennonite colonies in Latin America"", This data is provided in support of the paper "Pious Pioneers: The expansion of Mennonite colonies in Latin America", published in Journal of Land Use Science, December 15, 2020, 1–17, Taylor and Francis 
Accessed August 29, 2020.
 Bolivia's isolated Mennonite community

Bolivian people of European descent
 
 
Sexual abuse scandals in Protestantism